Șona is a commune located in Alba County, Transylvania, Romania. It is composed of seven villages: Alecuș (Elekes), Biia (Magyarbénye), Doptău (Dobtanya), Lunca Târnavei (until 1964 Spini; Kistövis), Sânmiclăuș (Betlenszentmiklós), Șona, and Valea Sasului (Szászvölgy).

The commune lies on the Transylvanian Plateau, on the banks of the Târnava Mică River.

At the 2011 census, 68.5% of inhabitants were Romanians, 25.2% Hungarians, and 5.8% Roma.

Natives
Farkas Bethlen

References

Communes in Alba County
Localities in Transylvania